William Eddy may refer to:

 William Eddy (politician) (1865–1926), Australian politician
 William A. Eddy (1896–1962), U.S. minister to Saudi Arabia
 William Abner Eddy (1850–1909), American accountant and journalist
 William C. Eddy (1902–1989), American inventor
 William F. Eddy (1852–?), Canadian businessman, Mayor of Regina

See also
William Ede (disambiguation)